"You Can't Stop Love" is a debut song recorded by American country music group Schuyler, Knobloch & Overstreet.  It released in July 1986 as the first single from the album Schuyler, Knobloch & Overstreet.  The song reached #9 on the Billboard Hot Country Singles & Tracks chart.  The song was written by group members Thom Schuyler and Paul Overstreet.

Chart performance

References

1986 songs
1986 debut singles
S-K-O songs
Songs written by Paul Overstreet
Songs written by Thom Schuyler
Song recordings produced by James Stroud
MTM Records singles